Lothersdale is a small village and civil parish in the Craven district of North Yorkshire, England, near Skipton and within the triangle formed by Skipton, Cross Hills and Colne. It is a small community of about 200 houses but local amenities include a park, church, chapel, pub, village hall, clubhouse and (Ofsted 'Outstanding') primary school. The Pennine Way runs through it.

The Parish Council has five elected members and meets on the second Thursday of each month (except for August) at 7.30 p.m. It decides on the amount of local taxes (the precept), planning applications, and numerous other issues pertaining to local life.

No house in the village is connected to mains gas or water and it has very limited mobile and broadband connection. This has had the effect of limiting the amount of development that has taken place and gives the village an unspoilt atmosphere. It has also caused conflict for more than 25 years over the ownership rights of water from various springs.

The village boasts a recreation ground which includes woodland walks, the village beck, bird-hide, picnic areas, a football pitch, a multi-use games area and a new children's playground.
 
The village pub is the Hare and Hounds. It serves hot food and real ales. The village hall is a popular venue for parties, concerts, dances, whist drives and other social events. In recent years the village has held an annual 'Party in the Park' in the recreation ground.

On the site of a former lime and baryte quarry is Raygill Lakes, which was the first site studied by the Yorkshire Geological Society in 1875. Mammalian and marine fossils were discovered here.

The village has good rail connections (two miles away in Cononley) to Leeds, Bradford and London, about three hours by rail from Skipton. Access to Manchester is via the M65 motorway at Colne.

References

Further reading
The History of Lothersdale; by Kenneth Wilson and associated writers. [Lothersdale]: Lothersdale Parish Council, 1972 (includes: Chapter 9: The Society of Friends; Arthur Raistrick)

External links

Lothersdale: an image of England; BBC One; 1975

Villages in North Yorkshire
Civil parishes in North Yorkshire